A special election was held in  on October 30, 1810 to fill a vacancy left in the 11th Congress by the death of James Cox (DR) on September 12, 1810.

Election returns

Scudder took his seat on December 3, 1810

See also
List of special elections to the United States House of Representatives

References

New Jersey 1810 at-large
New Jersey 1810 at-large
1810
New Jersey 1810 at-large
United States House of Representatives
United States House of Representatives 1810 at-large